The 2017–18 EFL League One (referred to as the Sky Bet League One for sponsorship reasons) was the 14th season of the Football League One under its current title, and the 25th season under its current league division format.

Team changes
The following teams have changed division since the 2016–17 season.

To League One 
Promoted from League Two
 Portsmouth
 Plymouth Argyle
 Doncaster Rovers
 Blackpool

Relegated from Championship
 Blackburn Rovers
 Wigan Athletic
 Rotherham United

From League One 
Promoted to Championship
 Sheffield United
 Bolton
 Millwall

Relegated to League Two
 Port Vale
 Swindon
 Coventry City
 Chesterfield

Teams

Managerial changes

League table

Play-offs

Results

Top scorers

References

 
EFL League One seasons
3
Eng

2017–18 English Football League